Melchor Ocampo is a town and municipality in State of Mexico, Mexico. The municipality covers an area of  32.48 km².

As of 2005, the municipality had a total population of 37,706.

Name 
From its founding until 1894, the municipality was known as Tlacomulco and then San Miguel Tlaxomulco; the latter portion comes from the Nahuatl words  tlalli (earth); xomolli (corner or small place) and co of coztic (in), that is to say, "In some corner of the earth" or "a little corner of ground".

In 1894, the legislature of the State of Mexico decreed that the place would be called "Ocampo". Currently it is known as Melchor Ocampo in honor of the deceased reformist politician and philosopher of that name.

The symbol on the town flag (an "L" with the top ending in a fluer-de-lis, with a rectangle leaning against its inside) is intended to represent the Náhuatl form of the town's old name.

Origin and conquest

While the general area between Cuautitlán, Zumpango and Tepotzotlán was probably under human influence from the Toltec period at the latest, and perhaps as early as 2500 B.C.,  there is no record of a settlement at the exact site of the current municipality until after the Spanish conquest.  In 1519 the area was under the tlatoani of Cuautitlán ("Guautitlan" in contemporary records). In 1521 it came under Spanish rule, when Cortez's forces "occupied it without resistance".

After the conquest,  the town of Cuautitlán and everything that pertained to it,  including Tlaxomulco, was given as an encomienda to Alonso de Ávila, one of Cortez's captains.

Culture 

The most notable monument in the municipality is the principal church, dedicated to the Archangel Michael (San Miguel).  It is built of black volcanic rock (tezontle) and has a façade in baroque style.  It was built in the seventeenth century.

Population History

External links
 Municipal Government webpage

References

Municipalities of the State of Mexico
Populated places in the State of Mexico